The 2010 Atlantic hurricane season was the first of three consecutive very active Atlantic hurricane seasons, each with 19 named storms. This above average activity included 12 hurricanes, equaling the number that formed in 1969. Only the 2020 and 2005 seasons have had more, at 14 and 15 hurricanes respectively. Despite the high number of hurricanes, not one hurricane hit the United States making the season the only season with 10 or more hurricanes without a United States landfall. The overall tropical cyclone count in the Atlantic exceeded that in the West Pacific for only the second time on record. The season officially began on June 1 and ended on November 30, dates that conventionally delimit the period during each year when tropical cyclone formation is most likely. The first cyclone, Alex intensified into the first June hurricane since Allison in 1995. The month of September featured eight named storms. October featured five hurricanes, including Tomas, which became the latest on record in a calendar year to move through the Windward Islands. Activity was represented with an accumulated cyclone energy (ACE) value of 165 units, which was the eleventh highest value on record at the time. The activity in 2010 was heightened due to a very strong La Niña, which also led to an inactive Pacific hurricane season.

Numerous tropical cyclones affected countries bordering the Atlantic Ocean throughout 2010. Alex caused 52 deaths and up to $1.52 billion (2010 USD) in damage as it struck northern Mexico in June. The next month, Tropical Storm Bonnie struck Florida as a weak cyclone, leaving one dead. Tropical Storm Colin led to one drowning death, and rip currents produced by Tropical Depression Five killed two people. Hurricane Danielle passed east of Bermuda while Earl moved parallel to the East Coast of the United States and into Nova Scotia throughout late August, resulting in 2 and 8 deaths, respectively. In early September, Tropical Storm Hermine caused significant flooding across Texas and killed 8 people. The strongest hurricane of the year, Igor, killed four as it traversed the Atlantic and across Newfoundland. Latin America was badly hit by Hurricane Karl and Tropical Storm Matthew, with 22 and 126 deaths, respectively. In late September, Tropical Storm Nicole produced torrential rainfall from the Caribbean into the U.S. East Coast, resulting in 16 fatalities. Hurricane Paula caused a tourist to drown offshore Cozumel in mid-October, while Hurricane Richard left two dead in Belize later that month. The season concluded with Tomas which caused 35 fatalities along its track through the Caribbean and into the Atlantic.

Seasonal forecasts 

Before and during each hurricane season, several forecasts of hurricane activity are issued by national meteorological services, scientific agencies, and noted hurricane experts. The forecasts include weekly and monthly changes in significant factors that help determine the number of tropical storms, hurricanes, and major hurricanes within a particular year. According to NOAA, the average Atlantic hurricane season between 1950 and 2005 contained 10.3 tropical storms, 6.2 hurricanes, 2.7 major hurricanes, and an accumulated cyclone energy (ACE) index of 66–103 units. Broadly speaking, ACE is a measure of the power of a tropical or subtropical storm multiplied by the length of time it existed. Therefore, a storm with a longer duration will have high values of ACE. Accordingly, tropical depressions are not included in the count. After the storm has dissipated, typically after the end of the season, the NHC re-examines the data and produces a final report on each storm. These revisions can lead to a revised ACE total either upward or downward compared to the original value. The National Oceanic and Atmospheric Administration (NOAA) typically categorizes a season as either above-average, average, or below-average based on the cumulative ACE Index, but the number of tropical storms, hurricanes, and major hurricanes within a hurricane season are occasionally considered as well.

Pre-season forecasts 
On December 7, 2009, Tropical Storm Risk (TSR) issued their first extended range outlook for the 2010 Atlantic hurricane season, predicting 13.9 named storms, 7.4 hurricanes, 3.4 major hurricanes, and an ACE index of 135 units. The organization referenced two main factors, slower trade winds across the Caribbean and above-average ocean temperatures across the Atlantic, for an above-average season. Two days later, Colorado State University (CSU) issued their first extended range outlook, projecting 11 to 16 named storms, 6 to 8 hurricanes, 3 to 5 major hurricanes, and an ACE index of 100 to 162 units. The organization stated that although a strong El Niño event was ongoing at the release of their forecast, a continuation of a warm El Niño–Southern Oscillation was unlikely to persist through the hurricane season. On January 27, 2010, The Weather Company (formerly WSI) called for the year to feature 13 named storms, 7 hurricanes, and 3 major hurricanes.

CSU issued a more detailed update on April 7, upping their forecast to 15 named storms, 8 hurricanes, 4 major hurricanes, and an ACE index of 150. More confidence in the weakening of El Niño (and thus lower vertical wind shear) and the continuation of anomalously warm sea surface temperatures across the Atlantic Ocean were cited. Two days later, TSR revised their forecast upward to 16.3 named storms, 8.5 hurricanes, 4 major hurricanes, and an ACE index of 159 units. In their April 21 update, WSI predicted the most active year since the record-breaking 2005 season, with 16 named storms, 9 hurricanes, and 5 major hurricanes. Five days later, North Carolina State University (NCSU) released their only forecast for the season, with 15 to 18 named storms and 8 to 11 hurricanes. TSR largely maintained their forecast for their May 25 release. The next day, TWC/WSI again raised their forecast to 18 named storms, 10 hurricanes, and 5 major hurricanes. NOAA, meanwhile, released their forecast prediction for the 2010 season on May 27. The organization called for an active to extremely active year including 14 to 23 named storms, 8 to 14 hurricanes, and 3 to 7 major hurricanes, referencing a continuation of the active era that began in 1995.

Mid-season outlooks 
On the first day of the 2010 Atlantic season, Florida State University's Center for Ocean-Atmospheric Prediction Studies (FSU COAPS) released their only predictions, forecasting 17 named storms, 10 hurricanes, and an ACE index of 156 units. The next day, CSU upped their forecast to 18 named storms, 10 hurricanes, and 5 major hurricanes. On June 4, TSR followed suit, with 17.7 named storms, 9.5 hurricanes, 4.4 major hurricanes, and an ACE index of 182 units. The United Kingdom's Met Office (UKMET) released their only prediction for the season on June 17, with the most likely number of tropical storms being 20 and the most likely value of the ACE index being 204 units. On June 23, TWC/WSI once again upped their forecast, noting 20 named storms, 11 hurricanes, and 5 major hurricanes. TSR issued their boldest predictions on July 6, with 19.1 named storms, 10.4 hurricanes, 4.8 major hurricanes, and an ACE index of 203 units.

Following a slightly less active June and July than originally anticipated, TWC/WSI downgraded their number of named storms from 20 to 19 on July 21, but kept their June numbers of 11 hurricanes and 5 major hurricanes untouched. In their final seasonal prediction on August 4, CSU left their June numbers the same, predicting 18 named storms, 10 hurricanes, 5 major hurricanes, and an ACE index of 185 units. That same day, TSR reduced their predictions for their final seasonal outlook, expecting 17.8 named storms, 9.7 hurricanes, 4.5 major hurricanes, and an ACE index of 183 units. On August 5, NOAA announced the official development of La Niña in their last seasonal outlook. The organization lowered the upper bounds of their forecast compared to May due to less early season activity than expected, in all predicting 14 to 20 named storms, 8 to 12 hurricanes, and 4 to 6 major hurricanes. TWC/WSI issued two final forecasts on August 25 and September 22, both expecting 18 named storms and 10 hurricanes. The number of major hurricanes was increased from 5 to 6 in their September update, however.

Seasonal summary 

Unlike on the eastern Pacific, which tied 1977 for the least active year in the reliable records, the 2010 Atlantic hurricane season ended as one of the most active in recorded history. It began on June 1 and ended on November 30, dates that conventionally delimit the period during each year when most tropical cyclones form in the Atlantic Ocean. The first system of the season, Hurricane Alex, developed on June 25; the final system of the season, Hurricane Tomas, dissipated on November 7. A total of 21 tropical depressions formed within the basin, of which 19 intensified into tropical storms, 12 intensified into hurricanes, and 5 further intensified into major hurricanes. The year's 12 hurricanes matched 1969 for the third highest count on record, exceeded only by 2005 and 2020. There were more tropical storms in the Atlantic than the West Pacific in 2010, the second such occurrence on record after 2005. Throughout the entire Atlantic tropical cyclone database, 2010 is the only year with more than 10 hurricanes not to feature a hurricane landfall on the United States.

Several factors contributed to exceptional activity. A strong El Niño observed in 2009 rapidly transitioned into a strong La Niña by mid-summer 2010, projecting anomalously low vertical wind shear across the Atlantic Ocean. Ocean temperatures reached record levels across the basin, averaging at 0.82 °C above the 1981–2010 average. Not only did ocean temperatures surpass 2005 to break the record overall, averaged water temperatures across the Main Development Region (MDR) of the Atlantic set monthly records from February to October 2010. This was aided by a strongly negative North Atlantic Oscillation that contributed to weaker trade winds and thus anomalous warming of ocean temperatures in the months leading up to the hurricane season. Lower sea level pressures were prevalent throughout much of the season, trailing only 1955 for the lowest average values across the MDR during the August to October period. In spite of the high number of tropical cyclones, mid-level dry air dominated the tropical Atlantic throughout the peak of the season, perhaps hindering the season from being even more active.

The beginning of the Atlantic season featured Alex, the first hurricane observed in June since Hurricane Allison in 1995. One tropical storm, Bonnie, and a tropical depression formed in the month of July. August featured five cyclones – a tropical depression, tropical storms Colin and Fiona, as well as hurricanes Danielle and Earl (both of which further intensified into major hurricanes). September, the peak period of the Atlantic hurricane season, was its most active month, featuring eight tropical cyclones: tropical storms Gaston, Hermine, Matthew, and Nicole, as well as hurricanes Igor, Julia, Karl, and Lisa. This put the season into a tie with 2002 and 2007 for the most tropical storms to develop in September, a record that stood until it was surpassed in 2020. Well above-average activity continued into October, with the formation of hurricanes Otto, Paula, Richard, Shary, and Tomas, one hurricane short of the monthly record set in 1870. Tomas persisted into the subsequent month before dissipating on November 7, heralding the end of the season's tropical cyclone activity.

The season's activity was reflected with an ACE rating of approximately 165 units, the highest since 2005.

Systems

Hurricane Alex 

A disturbance developed within the Intertropical Convergence Zone on June 17 and remained well defined as it tracked westward. An area of low pressure developed in association with the system over the northwestern Caribbean on June 24 and further organized into a tropical depression by 18:00 UTC the following day, supported by data from a reconnaissance aircraft. Steered west and eventually west-northwest by an expansive ridge across the Bahamas and Gulf of Mexico, the depression intensified into Tropical Storm Alex at 06:00 UTC on June 26 and attained an initial peak with winds of  before moving ashore near Belize City, Belize several hours later. Alex maintained tropical storm intensity as it crossed the Yucatán Peninsula, and upon executing a northward turn and a second westward turn began to steadily intensify. Once inland, Alex turned west-southwest and rapidly weakened over the mountainous terrain of Mexico. The increasingly disrupted system dissipated at 06:00 UTC on July 2.

The precursor disturbance to Alex flooded hundreds of homes and prompted the evacuation of thousands of residents in the Dominican Republic. Damage to crops and hundreds of structures occurred across Central America. In southern Mexico, torrential rainfall led to numerous landslides and mudslides, while swollen rivers flooded many homes and roads were collapsed. Heavy rainfall broke accumulation records, a storm surge of at least 3. caused beach erosion, and embedded supercells produced nine tornadoes (all rated EF0). Along its track, Alex was responsible for 51 deaths (22 missing) and $1.52 billion in damage.

Tropical Depression Two 

A tropical wave emerged off the western coast of Africa on June 24, eventually emerging into the Gulf of Mexico on July 7. An area of low pressure became discernible, and with data from a reconnaissance aircraft, the system was upgraded to a tropical depression by 00:00 UTC on July 8. The depression degenerated into a remnant low by 06:00 UTC on July 9 and dissipated over northern Mexico a day later.

In advance of landfall, the NHC issued a tropical storm warning from Baffin Bay, Texas to Rio San Fernando, Mexico; this was canceled once the storm failed to intensify. The Servicio Meteorológico Nacional warned residents of gusty winds and heavy rainfall in excess of  capable of producing localized flooding and mudslides. Upon moving ashore, the depression produced a storm surge of  along the southern coastline of Texas. Rainfall accumulations peaked at  along the Guadalupe River, with lesser amounts elsewhere, including across areas affected by Hurricane Alex a week prior.

Tropical Storm Bonnie 

A tropical wave emerged off the western coast of Africa on July 10. Once north of the Greater Antilles, convective growth and the development of a well-defined surface low led to the formation of a tropical depression just south of Acklins Island by 06:00 UTC on July 22. Amid a brief reprieve in strong upper-level winds, the depression intensified into Tropical Storm Bonnie as it crossed Ragged Island around 23:15 UTC that day. Bonnie weakened to a tropical depression as it crossed South Florida, and the persistent effects of strong wind shear prevented intensification in the Gulf of Mexico. The cyclone degenerated into a remnant low by 00:00 UTC on July 25 and later moved into southeastern Louisiana before dissipating later that day.

In nearby Puerto Rico, one person drowned in a swollen river. Upon designation, tropical storm watches and warnings were issued along portions of the Florida coastline. Approximately 14,000 Florida customers lost power as Bonnie moved ashore. Remnant moisture combined with a cold front to produce damaging severe thunderstorms across portions of the Southeast in late July.

Tropical Storm Colin 

The interaction of two tropical waves and an upper-level trough led to the development of a tropical depression over the central Atlantic by 12:00 UTC on August 2. The depression steadily organized after formation, intensifying into Tropical Storm Colin by 06:00 UTC on August 3. Over the coming days, the trough decelerated and recurved north into a weakness in the ridge while still producing tropical storm-force winds. Satellite imagery showed the reformation of a well-defined circulation by 12:00 UTC on August 5, and the system was once again classified as Tropical Storm Colin. Colin weakened to a tropical depression by 00:00 UTC on August 8 and degenerated into a trough for a second time twelve hours later; the trough dissipated early on August 9.

A tropical storm warning was raised for Bermuda as Colin approached but was later discontinued as it weakened. L.F. Wade International Airport received  of rainfall. Although Colin steered well clear of the Carolinas, swells from the storm prompted at least 205 water rescues, and a rip current off Ocracoke led to the drowning of one man.

Tropical Depression Five 

As the newly formed cyclone moved west-northwest, a nearby upper-level low imparted high wind shear and dry air entrainment, and the depression degenerated into a remnant low twelve hours later without attaining tropical storm intensity. Upon degeneration, the low moved into the Gulf Coast of the United States and conducted a clockwise loop. It emerged into the Gulf of Mexico again on August 16, where the disturbance nearly regenerated into a tropical cyclone before making a second landfall in Mississippi the next day. The remnants dissipated over the southeastern portion of the state on August 18.

The tropical depression produced waves up to  around Anna Maria Island, where two people died of fatigue-related heart attacks after being caught in a rip current. Heavy rainfall in the New Orleans, Louisiana and Mobile, Alabama areas—aided by instability from the remnants of the depression—flooded streets, inundating an apartment complex in the former city and cutting power to 1,921 customers in the latter city. Forty homes and businesses were flooded in Avoyelles Parish. Rainfall accumulations peaked south of Natchez, Mississippi, where  was documented.

Hurricane Danielle 

Steered by a ridge to its north, the depression steadily organized as it moved west-northwest, intensifying into Tropical Storm Danielle by 06:00 UTC on August 22 and attaining hurricane intensity the following day. Influenced by moderate wind shear initially, Danielle maintained its status as a minimal hurricane for several days. Danielle began to round the western periphery of the steering ridge after peak intensity, curving northeast as it began an eyewall replacement cycle. The inner core change, combined with progressively cooler waters, resulted in the system weakening to a tropical storm by 18:00 UTC on August 30 and degenerating into a remnant low six hours later. The low became extratropical on August 31 maintained distinct until dissipating well east-southeast of Greenland on September 3.

A tropical storm watch was issued for Bermuda on August 27 but swiftly canceled the next day as Danielle steered well clear of the island. Swells from the powerful hurricane reached the East Coast of the United States, leading to the rescues of 250 people in Ocean City, Maryland and an additional 70 people off the coast of Central Florida. The body of a man—whose death appeared to have been from drowning—was pulled from the waters of Satellite Beach, Florida; a second man went missing in Ocean City, but his body was never recovered and the search was eventually called off. Researchers examining the wreckage of RMS Titanic were forced to seek refuge in St. John's, Newfoundland; swells as large as  impacted the coastline of Newfoundland.

Hurricane Earl 

A vigorous tropical wave entered the Atlantic on August 23, developing into a tropical depression off the western coast of Africa two days later at 06:00 UTC. The nascent depression steadily intensified as it moved west-northwest, becoming Tropical Storm Earl six hours after formation and further strengthening into a hurricane by 12:00 UTC on August 29. A weakness in the steering ridge, created by leading Hurricane Danielle, caused Earl to narrowly miss the northern Leeward Islands as it strengthened into a Category 4 hurricane on August 30. Increased shear and a second replacement cycle caused the hurricane to rapidly weaken thereafter. It weakened to a tropical storm by 00:00 UTC on September 4, and although the system briefly re-attained hurricane intensity as it moved ashore near Liverpool, Nova Scotia, Earl transitioned into an extratropical cyclone twelve hours later. The extratropical low merged with another system over the Labrador Sea the next day.

Severe impacts from Earl in Antigua and Barbuda amounted to EC $34 million ($12.6 million USD). One person was electrocuted trying to restore power. Approximately 7,500 residents were left without power across Saint Martin, Saint Barthélemy, and Guadeloupe. Heavy rainfall and strong wind gusts battered Saint Kitts and Nevis, leaving streets flooded and many residences without power. In the British Virgin Islands, wind gusts up to  damaged or destroyed dozens of structures, resulting in up to $7 million in damage. Substantial effects were also observed in the U.S. Virgin Islands, where total infrastructure losses were placed at $2.5 million and revenue losses from deterred vacationers reached $10.7 million. Flooding and downed power lines in Puerto Rico left 187,000 residents without power and an additional 60,000 without water access. As Earl paralleled the East Coast of the United States, it produced varying degrees of impact; North Carolina was hardest hit, with over $3.5 million in damage. Three people were killed in rough seas off Florida, one person was killed by rough seas off Maine, and two people were killed by rip currents off New Jersey. Approximately 940,000 people were left without power across Nova Scotia and surrounding areas, where one death occurred.

Tropical Storm Fiona 

Satellite imagery and data from a research aircraft indicated the depression intensified into Tropical Storm Fiona six hours later. Fiona's position between the mid-level ridge and the large circulation of Hurricane Earl off The Carolinas turned the storm northwest and then north as it encountered increasingly strong wind shear and began to weaken. Expansive outflow from Earl caused Fiona's low-level circulation to become dislocated from its convection, and the system degenerated into a remnant low by 00:00 UTC on September 4.

Tropical Storm Gaston 

Despite initial projections that Gaston would become an increasingly strong hurricane over the central Atlantic, exceptionally dry air began to wrap in the storm after peak. It weakened to a tropical depression by 00:00 UTC on September 2 and further degenerated into a remnant low by 18:00 UTC that day. The system nearly regenerated into a tropical cyclone the following day as shallow convection wrapped into the center, but the increased organization was transient and it ultimately remained a remnant low until dissipating southeast on the Dominican Republic on September 8.

Tropical Storm Hermine 

The East Pacific's Tropical Depression Eleven-E moved across Mexico and degenerated into a remnant low on September 4. Its low and mid-level circulations survived crossing Mexico and entered the southern Bay of Campeche, reforming as a tropical depression by 18:00 UTC on September 5. Despite being well inland, Hermine continued to maintain an inner core and only slowly weakened. It fell to tropical depression status over central Texas by 00:00 UTC on September 8 and ultimately dissipated over southeastern Kansas by 06:00 UTC on September 10.

Dozens of structures were damaged, trees and power lines were downed, and many residents were left without power. Impact was more significant across the United States—most notably in Texas—where 283 homes sustained minor damage, 231 homes sustained major damage, and 68 homes were destroyed. In Oklahoma, flash flooding resulted in severe infrastructure damage. Several tornadoes touched down in both states. Seven people were killed in Texas and one in Oklahoma, while the total damage total reached $240 million.

Hurricane Igor 

The most intense hurricane of the season began as a tropical wave that organized into a tropical depression southeast of Cabo Verde early on September 8. Initial organization was fast-paced, and the depression intensified into Tropical Storm Igor six hours after formation. Igor moved west to west-northwest for several days while embedded within the monsoon trough. Increased vertical shear caused the cyclone to temporarily weaken to a tropical depression by 12:00 UTC on September 9, but it re-attained tropical storm intensity the next day and further strengthened to a hurricane by 00:00 UTC on September 12. Inner core changes continued after peak, and Igor continued as a Category 4 hurricane for several days until increased shear and dry air entrainment forced a consistent weakening trend early on September 17. The system recurved north-northeast while passing within  of Bermuda as a minimal hurricane. The extratropical low was absorbed by a larger such system between Greenland and Labrador on September 23.

Although Igor steered well clear of the Caribbean, large swells of  propagated from the storm, drowning one person in St. Croix and another in Puerto Rico. Large waves affected the East Coast of the United States, and one person drowned in Surf City, North Carolina. Impacts near the storm's landfall in Newfoundland were more severe. Run-off from the torrential rainfall damaged or destroyed structures, killed a man when his driveway was washed out and he was swept away, and isolated approximately 150 communities. Approximately 50,000 households lost power during the peak of the storm. The overall damage total reached $200 million across Newfoundland, making Igor the costliest hurricane on record there. It was regarded as the worst storm of tropical origin to hit Newfoundland since 1935.

Hurricane Julia 

A vigorous tropical wave moved off the western coast of Africa on September 11 and almost immediately led to the formation of a tropical depression by 06:00 UTC the next day. Steered in a traditional west-northwest fashion, the depression intensified into Tropical Storm Julia twelve hours later and continued steady strengthening to become a hurricane by 12:00 UTC September 14. Julia became the easternmost Category 4 hurricane on record in the Atlantic as a result. After peak, the system recurved around a ridge while simultaneously weakening under influence of Hurricane Igor's outflow. The remnant low turned back west, dissipating late on September 24.

The Government of Cabo Verde issued a tropical storm warning for the island chain as Julia approached. Gusts of  damaged maize crops, and waves of  affected the coastline. Landslides isolated the community of Covão Grande.

Hurricane Karl 

Although the storm's winds diminished over land, the structure of the storm actually improved, allowing Karl to quickly become a hurricane by 18:00 UTC on September 16 once emerging over the Bay of Campeche. A period of rapid deepening brought the cyclone to its peak of  early on September 17, the only major hurricane on record in the Bay of Campeche. Increasing shear and dry air entrainment caused Karl to weaken slightly, but it retained winds of  while making landfall just north of Veracruz, Mexico by 16:45 UTC on September 17.

Throughout Quintana Roo, heavy rains from Karl resulted in scattered flooding which forced hundreds of families from their homes. More than 600 houses were destroyed in the city of Chetumal as a result of flooding and landslides. At the height of the storm, a total of 54,265 residents were without power; however, most had their electricity restored within a day. Thousands of hectares of crops were lost. Strong winds uprooted hundreds of thousands of trees and downed power lines, leaving up to 280,000 residents in the dark. More than 200,000 homes were damaged or destroyed across the states of Veracruz, Tabasco, and Oaxaca. A total of 22 people were killed by the storm, and the damage cost totaled to approximately $3.9 billion.

Hurricane Lisa 

Following a sequence of Cape Verde hurricanes, another tropical wave moved off the coast of Africa on September 16. A broad area of low pressure developed in association with the wave as it passed southwest of Cape Verde. An unusually weak subtropical ridge steered the system north, east, and then north again over subsequent days. The depression intensified into Tropical Storm Lisa six hours after formation, but fell back to tropical depression intensity by 18:00 UTC on September 22 as dry air entered the circulation. A more favorable environment allowed Lisa to re-attain tropical storm status by 12:00 UTC the following day and subsequently begin a period of rapid intensification. The small cyclone reached hurricane intensity by 21:00 UTC on September 24 and attained peak winds of  six hours later. Progressively cooler waters and stronger shear caused Lisa to weaken to a tropical storm early on September 25, weaken to a tropical depression early on September 26, and degenerate into a remnant low at 18:00 UTC that day.

Tropical Storm Matthew 

The system briefly emerged into the Gulf of Honduras on September 25 before making a second landfall north-northeast of Monkey River Town, Belize, with winds of  around 15:00 UTC. The system weakened quickly once inland, falling to a tropical depression by 18:00 UTC and degenerating into a remnant low by 12:00 UTC on September 26. The remnant low turned southwest and dissipated twelve hours later.

The precursor wave to Matthew produced heavy rainfall across portions of Venezuela, destroying several homes and leading to eight fatalities. Impacts extended across Central America, especially in Nicaragua where 70 people were killed. Bridges were collapsed, roads were destroyed, communication lines were downed, and up to 255 communities were affected by the storm there. Similar but less severe damage was observed in Honduras, where four people were killed, and in El Salvador, where one person died. The combined impacts of Hurricane Karl and Tropical Storm Matthew in the state cost up to $8 billion. Flooding from Matthew further inland in Mexico, which was already observing one of its wettest years on record, led to a landslide in Santa María Tlahuitoltepec that killed seven people.

Tropical Storm Nicole 

Affected by strong westerly shear, Nicole never inherited a traditional appearance on satellite imagery; instead, it was characterized by an ill-defined circulation west of most convection, with the strongest winds well displaced from the center. The cyclone attained peak winds of  shortly after formation, but its center of circulation became increasingly diffuse as Nicole tracked toward the Cuba coastline, leading to degeneration into a remnant low by 15:00 UTC on September 29. The low moved north-northeast into the Bahamas, where it became extratropical and quickly weakened to a trough on September 30.

Severe flooding and landslides affected up to 507,831 residents, resulting 16 deaths and 42 injuries. Flooded roadways isolated communities, trapping hundreds of people in their homes. Over 288,000 residences lost power, over 40 percent of the island's water supply systems were inoperable at one point, and dozens of bridges collapsed. Infrastructure damage totaled to $235.4 million, while property damage reached $3.2 million and agricultural damage amounted to $6.8 million. Similar impacts occurred across the Cayman Islands, with sporadic power outages, flooding in low-lying locations, and damaged houses. While the remnants of Nicole produced only minor impacts across Florida, mainly in the form of street flooding, impacts were much more severe across the Mid-Atlantic as the system combined with a large area of low pressure across the region.

Hurricane Otto 

The depression recurved sharply northeast and quickly strengthened into Subtropical Storm Otto six hours after formation. On October 7, Otto completed transition into a fully tropical cyclone as deep convection formed over its center, despite weakening during the process. The system further intensified into a hurricane by 12:00 UTC on October 8 and attained peak winds of  twelve hours later. The extratropical cyclone persisted for several days, eventually becoming a non-convective swirl early on October 14 and dissipating by 00:00 UTC on October 18.

Otto and its precursor disturbance brought several days of rainfall and gusty winds to the Greater Antilles. In St. Lucia, 400 houses were severely flooded or destroyed, access to water was cut off, and power outages were observed. Storm impacts in Saint Kitts and Nevis flooded homes, caused minor beach erosion, topped bridges, washed out roads, and caused severe disruption to electrical services. Flooding and landslides on surrounding islands closed roads and highways. Across the British Virgin Islands, the worst flooding in the nation's history—with precipitation amounts up to —overturned cars, damaged drainage pipes and utility lines, and left residents without water. Widespread flooding across Puerto Rico affected at least 295 roads, including at least 14 that were severely damaged, and impacted crops. Landslides and downed utility poles isolated communities, waters supplies were contaminated, and numerous people required rescuing.

Hurricane Paula 

The nascent cyclone intensified into Tropical Storm Paula six hours later, briefly moving ashore the northeastern tip of Honduras early on October 11 before re-emerging into the northwestern Caribbean. An increase in shear prompted a steady weakening trend as the system turned north and then east. The system further weakened to a tropical depression early on October 15 and degenerated into a remnant low by 12:00 UTC. The remnant low quickly became diffuse, dissipating at 18:00 UTC.

In northeastern Honduras, low-lying areas were evacuated and numerous homes were destroyed. Waves up to  affected the coastline. An American tourist drowned off Cozumel after succumbing to rough seas. Only very minor impacts were observed along the northeastern coastline of the Yucatán Peninsula. The strong winds downed many trees, blocking roadways, and damaged the roofs of several homes. The rain, however, was regarded as generally beneficial to crops and low reservoirs. Rough seas removed concrete from Havana's sea wall and submerged coastal streets under  of water.

Hurricane Richard 

The depression was slow to organize at first, affected by dry air and moderate shear from a trough over the Southeast United States and western Atlantic, but eventually strengthened into Tropical Storm Richard by 12:00 UTC on October 21 as it curved south and then west. Richard moved ashore near Gales Point, Belize, thirty minutes later. The system weakened rapidly once inland, degenerating into a remnant low by 00:00 UTC on October 26. Despite emerging over the Bay of Campeche, high wind shear prevented redevelopment and instead caused the feature to dissipate eighteen hours later.

Although Richard tracked north of Honduras, strong winds along the coastline downed trees and power lines. Mudslides stranded up to 15,000 people across 40 different towns. Farther north and west in Belize, the Belize Zoo and Tropical Education Center—popular attractions for tourists—were heavily damaged. About 80% of the grapefruit and nearly 25% of the orange crop were lost there. Two deaths were observed: one man was killed when his boat capsized in rough seas, while a second man was mauled to death by a jaguar that escaped after a tree mangled its cage. The damage cost topped $80 million.

Hurricane Shary 

Steered west-northwest and then sharply northeast ahead of an approaching cold front, the system intensified into Tropical Storm Shary six hours after formation. The storm became increasingly asymmetric as it interacted with the front, and Shary transitioned into an extratropical cyclone by 18:00 UTC that day. The extratropical system was completely absorbed by the front six hours later.

Hurricane Tomas 

The final tropical cyclone of the 2010 season developed from a tropical wave that moved off Africa on October 24. The wave pushed west, organizing into a tropical depression by 06:00 UTC on October 29 and into Tropical Storm Tomas six hours later while located a few hundred miles east of Barbados. The system reached hurricane intensity three hours later, and by 20:00 UTC, attained its peak winds of  while moving across St. Lucia. After moving into the Caribbean, a sharp increase in wind shear and dry air entrainment caused Tomas to dramatically weaken, and the storm fell to a tropical depression by 00:00 UTC on November 3. Fluctuating atmospheric conditions allowed Tomas to strengthen and oscillate between a tropical storm and hurricane as it curved through the Windward Passage and into the Atlantic. By 00:00 UTC on November 8, the cyclone succumbed to an increasingly unfavorable regime and became an extratropical cyclone. The storm rotated around a broader low in the western Atlantic before being absorbed by a larger extratropical low south of Newfoundland early on November 11.

Impacts throughout the Windward Islands were substantial, but most heavily concentrated in St. Lucia. There, gusts reached , toppling trees and power lines. Torrential rainfall up to  created mudslides and landslides that damaged or destroyed numerous structures, bridges, and vehicles. Most of the island's plantain and banana crops were destroyed. Up to 14 people were killed. Farther west in Curaçao, Tomas led to the most prolific rain event in four decades. An elderly man was killed after suffering a heart attack and drowning in his flooded vehicle, while a rescue worker died after a hospital wall collapsed. In Haiti, already ravaged by a catastrophic 7.0 MW earthquake less than a year prior, heavy rainfall flooded a refugee camp and triggered mudslides that destroyed homes and roads. Up to 35 people were killed there, though it was feared many more could die as Tomas exacerbated an already-deadly cholera outbreak.

Storm names 
The following list of names was used for named storms that formed in the North Atlantic during 2010. The names not retired from this list were used again in the 2016 season. This was the same list used in the 2004 season with the exceptions of Colin, Fiona, Igor, and Julia, which replaced Charley, Frances, Ivan, and Jeanne, respectively. The names Colin, Fiona, Igor, Julia, Paula, Richard, Shary, and Tomas were used for the first time this year (and only, in the cases of Igor and Tomas).

Retirement 

On March 16, 2011, at the 33rd Session of the RA IV hurricane committee, the World Meteorological Organization retired the names Igor and Tomas from its rotating name lists due to the number of deaths and damage they caused, and they will not be used again for another Atlantic hurricane. They were replaced with Ian and Tobias, respectively, for the 2016 Atlantic hurricane season.

Season effects 
This is a table of the storms that formed in the 2010 Atlantic hurricane season. This table includes each storm's name, duration, peak intensity, areas affected, damages, and death totals. Deaths in parentheses are additional and indirect (an example of an indirect death would be a traffic accident), but are still storm-related. Damage and deaths include totals while the storm was extratropical, a wave or a low. All of the damage figures are in 2010 USD (the listed damage figure is in millions).

See also 

 Atlantic hurricane season
 South-West Indian Ocean cyclone seasons: 2009–10, 2010–11
 Australian region cyclone seasons: 2009–10, 2010–11
 South Pacific cyclone seasons: 2009–10, 2010–11
 South Atlantic tropical cyclone

References

External links 

 The Weather Prediction Center's rainfall page for 2010 Tropical Cyclones
 The National Hurricane Center's website
 NOAA Visualization's annotated animation of the 2010 Atlantic hurricane season

 
Atlantic hurricane seasons
Articles which contain graphical timelines
Tropical cyclones in 2010